Dr. Jagabandhu Bose was an eminent physician and philanthropist of Bengal.

Education
Bose began his studies at Dhaka College, and moved to Calcutta Medical College in 1851 to begin his undergraduate medical studies. He received the Goodeve Medal for his dissection work in his first year at the school, and was appointed prosector under Dr. Alen Web. He received several honours and awards during his university career, including honours in anatomy and botany in his second year, gold medals in Pharmacology and Chemistry in his third year, and a gold medal in Medicine and the Goodeve Medal in Obstetrics in his fourth year. He received his medical degree from Calcutta University in 1863.

Career
Bose served for seven years as Second Practical Teacher under Dr. H. Walker at Calcutta Medical College. He next worked for six years as teacher of cadaver dissection in the Bengali medium. He next was appointed as a teacher of pharmacology, a post he held for 12 years.

Calcutta Medical School
In 1886, Bose was one of the founders of R. G. Kar Medical College and Hospital. He served as its first president and as Professor of pharmacology. He lobbied the government for permission for his students to dissect cadavers.

College of Physicians and Surgeons of Bengal
In 1895, Bose helped found the College of Physicians and Surgeons of Bengal, and he served as its first president.

In the Village: Dandirhat, under  Basirhat subdivision in the 24 Parganas (North) the Durga Puja famous in the name of "Dactar Barir Puja" founded by this family is still running.

References

1831 births
Year of death missing
20th-century Indian medical doctors
Indian philanthropists